Hlompho Alpheus Kekana (born 23 May 1985) is a South African former professional soccer player who last played for Mamelodi Sundowns. He retired on 31 August 2021 after he was released by the team.

On 4 March 2012, his team set a record in the Nedbank Cup when they beat Powerlines FC 24–0, with Kekana scoring seven of the goals.

On 26 March 2016, while playing for the national team, Kekana scored on a shot from 65 yards against Cameroon. In 2016, he won the CAF Champions League with Mamelodi Sundowns as the club's captain.

International career

International goals
Scores and results list South Africa's goal tally first.

References

External links

1985 births
Living people
People from Lepelle-Nkumpi Local Municipality
Northern Sotho people
South African soccer players
SuperSport United F.C. players
Association football midfielders
Association football defenders
Black Leopards F.C. players
Bloemfontein Celtic F.C. players
Mamelodi Sundowns F.C. players
South Africa international soccer players
2019 Africa Cup of Nations players
Soccer players from Limpopo
2014 African Nations Championship players
South Africa A' international soccer players